First ladies and gentlemen of Montana is a list of the first spouses of the State of Montana since 1889:

See also
 List of governors of Montana
 List of current United States first spouses

References

 
Lists of people from Montana
Lists of spouses